A crosier or crozier (also known as a paterissa, pastoral staff, or bishop's staff) is a stylized staff that is a symbol of the governing office of a bishop or abbot and is carried by high-ranking prelates of Roman Catholic, Eastern Catholic, Eastern Orthodox, Oriental Orthodox, and some Anglican, Lutheran, United Methodist and Pentecostal churches.

In Western Christianity the usual form has been a shepherd's crook, curved at the top to enable animals to be hooked.  In Eastern Christianity, it is found in two common forms: tau-shaped, with curved arms, surmounted by a small cross; or a pair of sculptured serpents or dragons curled back to face each other, with a small cross between them.

Other typical insignia of prelates are the mitre, the pectoral cross, and the episcopal ring.

History 
The origin of the crozier as a staff of authority is uncertain, but there were many secular and religious precedents in the ancient world. One example is the lituus, the traditional staff of the ancient Roman augurs, as well as the Staff of Moses in the Hebrew Bible. Many other types of the staff of office were found in later periods, some continuing to the modern day in ceremonial contexts.

In the Western Church the usual form has been a shepherd's crook, curved at the top to enable animals to be hooked.  This relates to the many metaphorical references to bishops as the shepherds of their "flock" of Christians, following the metaphor of Christ as the Good Shepherd.

The Eastern Orthodox and Eastern Rite Catholic crosier is found in two common forms. One is tau-shaped, with curved arms, surmounted by a small cross. The other has a top comprising a pair of sculptured serpents or dragons curled back to face each other, with a small cross between them. It is also reminiscent of the rod of the ancient Greek god Asclepius, whose worship was centered around the Aegean, including Asia Minor, indicating the role of the bishop as healer of spiritual diseases.

Staff of Moses
The Staff of Moses is first mentioned in the Book of Exodus (chapter 4, verse 2), when God appears to Moses in the burning bush. God asks what Moses has in his hand, and Moses answers "a staff" ("a rod" in the King James Version). The staff is miraculously transformed into a snake and then back into a staff. The staff is thereafter referred to as the "rod of God" or "staff of God" (depending on the translation).

Moses and Aaron appear before the Pharaoh of the Exodus, when Aaron's rod is transformed into a serpent. The Pharaoh's sorcerers are also able to transform their own rods into serpents, but Aaron's swallows them. Aaron's rod is again used to turn the Nile blood-red. It is used several times on God's command to initiate the Plagues of Egypt.

During the Exodus, Moses stretches out his hand with the staff to part the Red Sea. While in the wilderness after leaving Egypt, Moses does not follow God's command to "speak ye unto the rock before their eyes", instead he strikes the rock with the rod to create a spring for the Israelites from which to drink. Because Moses did not sanctify God before them but said "Hear now, ye rebels; must we fetch you water out of this rock?" Thus, Moses failed by honoring himself and not God.  For not doing what God commanded, God punished Moses by not letting him enter into the Promised Land (Book of Numbers 20:10–12).

Finally, Moses uses the staff in the battle at Rephidim between the Israelites and the Amalekites. When he holds up the "rod of God", the Israelites "prevail". When he drops it, their enemies gain the upper hand. Aaron and Hur help him to keep the staff raised until victory is achieved.

Official use 

The crosier is the symbol of the governing office of a bishop or Apostle.

Western Christianity 
In Western Christianity, the crosier (known as the pastoral staff, from the Latin pastor, shepherd) is shaped like a shepherd's crook. A bishop or church head bears this staff as "shepherd of the flock of God", particularly the community under his canonical jurisdiction, but any bishop, whether or not assigned to a functional diocese, may also use a crosier when conferring sacraments and presiding at liturgies. The Catholic Caeremoniale Episcoporum says that, as a sign of his pastoral function, a bishop uses a crosier within his territory, but any bishop celebrating the liturgy solemnly with the consent of the local bishop may also use it. It adds that, when several bishops join in a single celebration, only the one presiding uses a crosier.

A bishop usually holds his crosier with his left hand, leaving his right hand free to bestow blessings. The Caeremoniale Episcoporum states that the bishop holds the crosier with the open side of the crook forward, or towards the people. It also states that a bishop usually holds the crosier during a procession and when listening to the reading of the Gospel, giving a homily, accepting vows, solemn promises or a profession of faith, and when blessing people, unless he must lay his hands on them. When the bishop is not holding the crosier, it is put in the care of an altar server, known as the "crosier bearer", who may wear around his shoulders a shawl-like veil called a vimpa, so as to hold the crosier without touching it with his bare hands. Another altar server, likewise wearing a vimpa, holds the mitre when the bishop is not wearing it. In the Anglican tradition, the crosier may be carried by someone else walking before the bishop in a procession.

The crosier is conferred upon a bishop during his ordination to the episcopacy. It is also presented to an abbot at his blessing, an ancient custom symbolizing his shepherding of the monastic community. Although there is no provision for the presentation of a crosier in the liturgy associated with the blessing of an abbess, by long-standing custom an abbess may bear one when leading her community of nuns.

The traditional explanation of the crosier's form is that, as a shepherd's staff, it includes a hook at one end to pull back to the flock any straying sheep, a pointed finial at the other tip to goad the reluctant and the lazy, and a rod in between as a strong support.

The crosier is used in ecclesiastical heraldry to represent pastoral authority in the coats of arms of cardinals, bishops, abbots and abbesses. It was suppressed in most personal arms in the Catholic Church in 1969, and is since found on arms of abbots and abbesses, diocesan coats of arms and other corporate arms.

In the Church of God in Christ, the largest Pentecostal church in the United States, the presiding bishop bears a crosier as a sign of his role as positional and functional leader of the Church. In some jurisdictions of the United Methodist Church, bishops make use of crosiers at ceremonial events.

Papal usage 

Popes no longer carry a crosier and instead carry the papal ferula. In the first centuries of the church, popes did carry a crozier but this practice was phased out and disappeared by the time of Pope Innocent III in the thirteenth century. In the Middle Ages, much as bishops carried a crosier, popes carried a papal cross with three bars, one more than the two bars found on crosiers carried before archbishops in processions (see archiepiscopal cross). This too was phased out. Pope Paul VI introduced the modern papal pastoral staff, the papal ferula, in 1965. He and his successors have carried a few versions of this staff, but never a crosier.

Eastern Christianity 
In Eastern Christianity (Oriental Orthodoxy, Eastern Orthodoxy and Eastern Catholicism), bishops use a similar pastoral staff. When a bishop is consecrated, the crosier (Slavonic: pósokh) is presented to him by the chief consecrator following the dismissal at the Divine Liturgy.

The Archbishop of Cyprus has the unique privilege in canon law of carrying a paterissa shaped like an imperial sceptre. This is one of the Three Privileges granted to the Orthodox Church of Cyprus by Byzantine Emperor Zeno (the other two being to sign his name in cinnabar, i.e., ink coloured vermilion by the addition of the mineral cinnabar, and to wear purple instead of black cassocks under his vestments).

An Eastern archimandrite (high-ranking abbot), hegumen (abbot) or hegumenia (abbess) who leads a monastic community also bears a crosier. It is conferred on them by the bishop during the Divine Liturgy for the elevation of the candidate. When he is not vested for worship, a bishop, archimandrite or abbot uses a staff of office topped with a silver pommel.

Oriental Orthodoxy 
In the Oriental Orthodox churches, crosiers are used as pastoral staffs held by bishops. The Armenian Apostolic Church uses both Eastern- and Western-style crosiers, while the Syriac Orthodox Church and Indian Orthodox Church have crosiers that are thicker than their Eastern counterparts. Clerics of the Ethiopian Orthodox Tewahedo Church and the Eritrean Orthodox Tewahedo Church use crosiers that look exactly like the Greek ones.

In the Coptic Orthodox Church of Alexandria, crosiers are sometimes somewhat longer and are always decorated with a blood red cloth around the top cross and the serpents. This symbolises the bishop's responsibility for the blood of his flock.

Description 
Crosiers are often made or decorated in precious metals, or are at least gilded or silver-plated. They may also be made of wood, though this is more common of the crosier carried by an abbot than of a bishop.

Western crosiers 
Crosiers used by Western bishops have curved or hooked tops, similar in appearance to staves traditionally used by shepherds, hence they are also known as crooks. In some languages there is only one term referring to this form, such as the German Krummstab or Dutch kromstaf. The crook itself (i.e., the curved top portion) may be formed as a simple shepherd's crook, terminating in a floral pattern, reminiscent of the Aaron's rod, or in a serpent's head. It may encircle a depiction of the bishop's coat of arms or the figure of a saint. In some very ornate crosiers, the place where the staff meets the crook may be designed to represent a church.

In previous times, a cloth of linen or richer material, called the sudarium (literally, "sweat cloth"), was suspended from the crosier at the place where the bishop would grasp it. This was originally a practical application which prevented the bishop's hand from sweating and discolouring (or being discoloured by) the metal. The invention of stainless steel in the late 19th century and its subsequent incorporation in material used for crosiers rendered moot its original purpose and it became more elaborate and ceremonial in function over time. In heraldry, the sudarium is often still depicted when crosiers occur on coats of arms.

In the Roman Catholic Church, the crosier is always carried by the bishop with the crook turned away from himself; that is to say, facing toward the persons or objects he is facing, regardless of whether he is the Ordinary or not. The Sacred Congregation of Rites on 26 November 1919, stated in a reply to the following question,

According to the 1983 book titled The Broken Cross: The Hidden Hand In The Vatican, pope John XXIII and his successors starter to use a non-Christian croisier, whose cross had an horizontal curve arm.<ref>{{cite book|author=Piers Compton|year=1983|url=https://ia800909.us.archive.org/34/items/TheBrokenCross/the%2520broken%2520cross.pdf&ved=2ahUKEwiwqZDS6vv7AhWKLewKHUOfAxsQFnoECA4QAQ&usg=AOvVaw0qpAlkj2i5ciniK2Ut4jLz|title=The Broken Cross: The Hidden Hand In The Vatican}}</ref>

 Eastern crosiers 
The crosiers carried by Eastern bishops, archimandrites, abbots and abbesses differ in design from the Western crosier. The Eastern crosier is shaped more like a crutch than a shepherd's staff.

The sudarium or crosier mantle is still used in the Eastern churches, where it is usually made of a rich fabric such as brocade or velvet, and is usually embroidered with a cross or other religious symbol, trimmed with galoon around the edges and fringed at the bottom. The sudarium is normally a rectangular piece of fabric with a string sewn into the upper edge which is used to tie the sudarium to the crosier and which can be drawn together to form pleats. As the sudarium has grown more elaborate, bishops no longer hold it between their hand and the crosier, but place their hand under it as they grasp the crosier, so that it is visible.

The Eastern crosier is found in two common forms. The older form is tau-shaped, with arms curving down, surmounted by a small cross. The other has a top composed of a pair of sculptured serpents or dragons with their heads curled back to face each other, with a small cross between them, representing the bishop's diligence in guarding his flock.

 Gallery 

See also
 Insular crozier
 Khakkhara

 Notes 

 References 
 
 
 Moss, Rachel. Medieval c. 400—c. 1600: Art and Architecture of Ireland. New Haven, CT: Yale University Press, 2014. 
 
 Sybille Schneiders: Baculus pastoralis. Bischofs- und Abtstäbe des 5. bis 12. Jahrhunderts in Irland und auf dem Kontinent : Typologie und Chronologie –  Herkunft und Verbreitung  – Besitzer und Gebrauch''. Freiburg i. Brsg. 2017 https://freidok.uni-freiburg.de/data/15776.

External links

 

 
Anglican liturgy
Catholic liturgy
Eastern Christian liturgical objects
Episcopacy in Anglicanism
Episcopacy in the Catholic Church
Formal insignia
Heraldic charges
Ritual weapons
Honorary weapons
Ceremonial weapons